The fourteenth season of NCIS an American police procedural drama originally aired on CBS from September 20, 2016, through May 16, 2017.

NCIS revolves around a fictional team of special agents from the Naval Criminal Investigative Service, which conducts criminal investigations involving the U.S. Navy and Marine Corps. This season brought three new characters: Wilmer Valderrama as NCIS Special Agent Nicholas "Nick" Torres, formerly working with an undercover unit, Agent Alexandra "Alex" Quinn (Jennifer Esposito), and Clayton Reeves (Duane Henry), an MI6 Senior Officer and liaison to NCIS.

Cast and characters

Main 
 Mark Harmon as Leroy Jethro Gibbs, NCIS Supervisory Special Agent (SSA) of the Major Case Response Team (MCRT) assigned to Washington's Navy Yard
 Pauley Perrette as Abby Sciuto, Forensic Specialist for NCIS
 Sean Murray as Timothy McGee, NCIS Senior Special Agent, second in command of MCRT
 Wilmer Valderrama as Nick Torres, NCIS Special Agent and former Undercover Agent
 Jennifer Esposito as Alexandra "Alex" Quinn, NCIS Special Agent
 Emily Wickersham as Eleanor "Ellie" Bishop, NCIS Special Agent
 Brian Dietzen as Dr. Jimmy Palmer, Assistant Medical Examiner for NCIS
 Rocky Carroll as Leon Vance, NCIS Director
 David McCallum as Dr. Donald "Ducky" Mallard, Chief Medical Examiner for NCIS
 Duane Henry as Clayton Reeves, MI6 Senior Officer and liaison to NCIS (episodes 5-24)

Recurring 
 Patrick Labyorteaux as Bud Roberts, JAG Captain from Falls Church
 Joe Spano as Tobias Fornell, FBI Senior Special Agent
 Robert Wagner as Anthony DiNozzo, Sr., father of former NCIS Special Agent Anthony DiNozzo
 Margo Harshman as Delilah Fielding, DoD Intelligence Analyst and McGee's girlfriend/fiancée/wife
 Juliette Angelo as Emily Fornell, Tobias Fornell's daughter
 Tony Gonzalez as Tony Francis, NCIS Special Agent
 Adam Campbell as young Donald Mallard 
 Laura San Giacomo as Dr. Grace Confalone, psychotherapist
 Mary Stuart Masterson as Jenna Flemming, Congresswoman
 French Stewart as Paul Triff, imprisoned serial killer
 Bruce Boxleitner as Vice Admiral C. Clifford Chase, Deputy Director for the Joint Chiefs of Staff
 Adam Croasdell as young Angus Clark, friend of young Donald Mallard
 John Finn as Gen. Charles T. Ellison, retired Commandant of the Marine Corps
 Richard Riehle as Maynard County Sheriff Walt Osorio and Sherlock Consortium member
 Jessica Walter as Judith McKnight, Sherlock Consortium member
 Todd Louiso as Lyle Waznicki, Sherlock Consortium member
 Sumalee Montano as Nicole Taggart, NCIS Special Agent
 Rafi Silver as Qasim Naasir, a translator who worked with NCIS, and boyfriend of NCIS Special Agent Eleanor Bishop

Guest appearances 

 Caroline Lagerfelt as young Victoria Mallard, Ducky's deceased mother
 Scott Bakula as Dwayne Cassius Pride, NCIS Senior Special Agent and unit commander in New Orleans
 Lucas Black as Christopher Lasalle, NCIS Special Agent and second in command in New Orleans
 Bruce McGill as Henry Rogers, Vietnam War veteran
 Mercedes Ruehl as Marie Quinn, Alex Quinn's mother
 Elisabeth Rohm as Mounted Police Sergeant May Dawson

Episodes

Production

Development 
NCIS was renewed for seasons fourteen and fifteen on February 29, 2016. During production of this season, NCIS showrunner Gary Glasberg died on September 28, 2016. In November 2016, it was reported that executive producer George Schenck and Frank Cardea, would succeed Gary Glasberg as co-showrunner for season fourteen.

Casting 
On April 4, 2016, Duane Henry, appeared as MI6 Officer Clayton Reeves in the final two episodes of thirteen season. Henry was promoted to series regular for season fourteen. Wilmer Valderrama joined the cast as Nicholas Torres on June 16, 2016, along with Jennifer Esposito as Alex Quinn on July 11, 2016. On June 9, 2017 (after the airing of the fourteenth season finale), Deadline Hollywood and TV Guide reported that Jennifer Esposito would not return for season fifteen.

Reception

Ratings

References

External links 

 
 

2016 American television seasons
2017 American television seasons
NCIS 14